Golf at the 2013 Asian Youth Games was held in Zhongshan International Golf Club, Nanjing, China between 18 and 20 August 2013.

Medalists

Medal table

Results

Boys' individual
18–20 August

Girls' individual
18–20 August

References
Boys Results
Girls Results

External links
Official Website

2013 Asian Youth Games events
Asian Youth Games
2013 Asian Youth Games
2013 Asian Youth Games